"What in the World Has Gone Wrong with Our Love" is a song written by Hank Cochran and Johnny Slate. It was originally and released as a duet by American country music artists Jack Greene and Jeannie Seely. Released in 1971, the song became a major hit on the country charts in early 1973.

Background and release
The song was recorded by Greene and Seely at Bradley's Barn, a studio owned by producer Owen Bradley. The track was officially recorded in September 1971 with Bradley producing the record.

It was released as a single in July 1972 via Decca Records. The song peaked at number 19 on the Billboard Hot Country Singles chart in early 1973. It was later released on their studio album in 1972, Two for the Show.

Track listing
7" vinyl single
 "What in the World Has Gone Wrong with Our Love" – 2:12
 "Willingly" – 2:30

Chart performance

References

1972 songs
1972 singles
Decca Records singles
Jack Greene songs
Jeannie Seely songs
Song recordings produced by Owen Bradley
Songs written by Hank Cochran